The women's heptathlon event at the 1998 Commonwealth Games was held on 16–17 September in Kuala Lumpur.

Results

References

Heptathlon
1998
1998 in women's athletics